Brossac is a commune in the Charente department in southwestern France.

Population

Castle of Brossac
The written sources describing defensive functions of that premises dates back to the early Middle Ages.  The castle was to control the surrounding fiefs and a former Romanian road Saintes – Périgueux – Cahors. 
Dating from the old Middle Ages the premises and the castle as a part of a Durfort's fief were in a possession of Vigier de La Cour Family. Nextly, in 1725 the premises and the castle fell under the rule of de Lafaye Family. The family started to use an epithet Bourgoin after the location name. During the French Revolution in 1789, Pierre de Lafaye du Bourgoin hold a position of a lawyer in Bordeoux Parliament, a seneschal judge in Brossac. In 1874 Pierre-François de Lafaye du Bourgoin re – constructed the small castle into a manor house in the style of Napoleon the 3rd. 
Lately, there was an artist painter, Mrs. Alexandra Blonde, who lived there.

References

External links
 Further information visit Brossac *BROSSAC VILLAGE

Communes of Charente